Hoseynabad-e Siahab (also Romanized as Ḩoseynābād-e Sīāhāb. Ḩoseynābād-e Sīāb, and Ḩoseynābād-e Seyāb) is a village in Deh Abbas Rural District, in the Central District of Eslamshahr County, Tehran Province, Iran. At the 2006 census, its population was 69, in 17 families.

References 

Populated places in Eslamshahr County